The following is a list of chairmen of Boca Juniors, one of the premier football teams in Argentina.

Jorge Amor Ameal is the current chairman, in charge since December 2019.

References

External links